The ZIL-4104 was a limousine built by ZIL from the late 1970s to the early 1980s, when it served as the transport of the elite of the Soviet Union. It is estimated that no more than fifty cars were produced each year.

Originally designated ZIL-115, the ZIL-4104 was an update of the ZIL-114 with which it shared the same chassis and over half its mechanical components. Despite sharing the same chassis, the ZIL-4104 was as much as 314 kg (692 lb) heavier than the 114.

Mechanically, the ZIL-4104 also improved on the 114. This engine developed 315 hp SAE Gross at 4,400 revs per minute and a substantial  at 2500 rpm.

Among its special features were special laminated windscreen and triple-layered windows, supposedly offering protection from radiation in case of nuclear attack, plus duplicated systems, including dual ignition, two 74-amp batteries in parallel, and two fuel pumps.

By 1984, a new three-speed automatic transmission had replaced the much outdated two-speed type that had been used by ZIL dating back to the first ZIL-111 in 1958.

As official state cars, the ZIL-4104s were "built under conditions of strict secrecy" and were "maintained in closed garages by a special division of the KGB", with everyone involved in building and servicing them sworn to secrecy.

Variants
ZIL-4104: Base model. Also known as ZIL-115; produced 1978-1983.
ZIL-4105: Armored version of ZIL-4104.
ZIL-41042: Ambulance version. Also known as ZIL-115A.
ZIL-41043: As ZIL-41042 except with communications equipment.
ZIL-41044: Short wheelbase convertible version.
ZIL-41045: Restyled ZIL-4104. Produced 1983-1985.
ZIL-41046: Radio car version. 
ZIL-41048: ZIL-4104 with automatic climate control. Produced in 1984.
ZIL-41051:Armored version of ZIL-41045.

ZIL-41044 and ZIL-41042
In the later years of the 4104 production run, ZIL introduced two derived models based on the 4104 chassis and the shortened ZIL-117 chassis not previously used with the 7.7 litre engine.

The 41044 was a shorter-wheelbase convertible. Unlike previous ZIL convertibles, it had only two doors but otherwise it was typically ZIL.
The 41042 was a rare station wagon produced by ZIL, but the few examples built were used as ambulances for general secretaries in the Soviet Union.

Notes

Sources 
 Thompson, Andy. Cars of the Soviet Union. Somerset, UK: Haynes Publishing,  2008.

Cars of Russia
4104
Cars introduced in 1978
1980s cars
Luxury vehicles
Soviet automobiles
Flagship vehicles
Limousines
Hearses